Diego Pereira Corrêa (born 18 September 1983 in Macaé), is a Brazilian football left-back who last played for América (Rio Grande do Norte). In March 2019, Diego Corrêa tested positive for benzoylecgonine, a metabolite of cocaine and was provisionally suspended by the Brazilian Anti-Doping Authority (ABCD).

Honours
Macaé
 Campeonato Brasileiro Série C: 2014

References

External links
 sambafoot
 CBF
 zerozero.pt
 Guardian Stats Centre
 goiasesporteclube.com
 goldeprata
 crvascodagama
 Diego Corrêa at Soccerway

1983 births
Living people
Brazilian footballers
Macaé Esporte Futebol Clube players
CR Vasco da Gama players
Olaria Atlético Clube players
Goiás Esporte Clube players
Associação Desportiva São Caetano players
Campeonato Brasileiro Série A players
Campeonato Brasileiro Série B players
Association football defenders
People from Macaé
Sportspeople from Rio de Janeiro (state)